Controlled digital lending (CDL) is a model by which libraries digitize materials in their collection and make them available for lending. It is based on interpretations of the United States copyright principles of fair use and copyright exhaustion.

Proponents argue that CDL is legal under those principles because it relies on digital rights management (DRM) to ensure that any library-owned digitized work that is in copyright is loaned for a limited period of time, and that a one-to-one ratio of owned copies to borrowers is maintained. However, opponents have criticized this interpretation, arguing that CDL involves copying, not mere lending, and that a library's purchase of a physical book does not entitle it to produce and lend an e-book or distribute digital copies.

Development

A precursor to CDL was the "Digitize and Lend" program begun in 2011 by the Open Library, a program of the Internet Archive. Also in 2011, the basic principles of CDL were articulated by Michelle Wu in her paper Building a Collaborative Digital Collection: A Necessary Evolution in Libraries. The use of the term "Controlled Digital Lending" to refer to this concept first appeared in the Position Statement on Controlled Digital Lending, published in 2018 alongside a white paper explaining their legal arguments.

CDL is increasingly being considered by a number of libraries and is being followed by library organizations across the United States as well as in other countries. Brazilian experts have argued that CDL can be applied in the country through a systematic interpretation of cultural rights that extrinsically limits copyright. The Internet Archive has gathered together 12 stories from their blog about libraries that are engaged in aspects of CDL. Lisa Petrides argues that in terms of school libraries, CDL is a positive step forward, but does not go far enough.

In May 2021, the International Federation of Library Associations and Institutions (IFLA) stated that "there is a strong socio-economic case" for CDL; that CDL respects "a number of desirable and widely-recognised principles [...] (libraries’ ability to freely acquire and lend, the technological neutrality of law, the possibility to combine exceptions)"; that CDL's legal basis supports the wider public interest.

Mechanism 
One of the core activities of a library is to loan materials, and proponents argue that CDL is a modern digital extension of this function. With CDL, a library takes a physical copy of a legally acquired item and digitizes it. After digitization, DRM is applied to the digital version, and the physical item is then made unavailable for loan. The library catalog record is usually the mechanism to give access to the digital loan, so the record is changed to point to the repository where the digital copy resides. In this way, there is only one copy being loaned for each copy owned by the library. After the loan expires, the DRM software removes the previous borrower's access and the book is available for loan to another patron.

The National Writers Union, an opponent of CDL, argues that CDL is not like lending, which does not require copying, and dispute the claim that only one copy at a time is available for reading. They say that CDL involves first making an unauthorized digital copy of a printed edition of a work, and then making an additional unauthorized digital copy for each "borrower". They also argue that unencrypted digital copies are distributed for viewing in a Web browser, and that these copies can be retained, viewed, or printed from the browser cache even after the e-book is marked as "returned" and is available for "lending" to other readers.

Controversy 
Authors' and publishers' groups have questioned the copyright interpretations that underlie CDL. In early 2019, the National Writers Union and a coalition of forty national and international organizations and federations of writers, photographers, visual artists, translators, publishers, and reproduction rights organizations released a statement entitled "Appeal from the victims of Controlled Digital Lending (CDL)"  that claimed that CDL "violates the economic and moral rights of authors."

In a news article in Publishers Weekly The American Association of Publishers is quoted as stating that CDL "'denigrates' the incentive copyright provides for authors and publishers." The Authors Guild relies on the case of Capitol Records, LLC v. ReDigi Inc., which established that ReDigi could not resell digital music, to argue that libraries would similarly be prohibited from loaning digitized version of books that were legally purchased, and argues that CDL results in lost sales.

Various scholars have framed the Capitol Records, LLC v. ReDigi Inc. as leaving room for CDL as part of a library's non-profit, educational mission. For example, the opinion, authored by Judge Pierre N. Leval, found ReDigi had no actual control of the digital music being sold (licensed iTunes mp3's) and that ReDigi “made reproductions of Plaintiffs’ works for the purpose of resale in competition with the Plaintiffs’ market for the sale of their sound recordings.” Various scholars have pointed out that libraries are not selling works in direct competition with publishers, like the Defendant in ReDigi. Libraries are purchasing books from the marketplace in order to loan the books to their patrons. Additionally Judge Pierre N. Leval, also the originator of the doctrine of transformative fair use, explained in the opinion that a use can be transformative when it “utilizes technology to achieve the transformative purpose of improving delivery of content without unreasonably encroaching on the commercial entitlements of the rights holder.” Again, analyzing this language from the case, some scholars have asserted that CDL does not unreasonably encroach the market for these books any differently than the legal uses already permitted by the copyright law when libraries loan books physically.

See also 
 E-book lending

References

Further reading

External links
 

Copyright law
Digital rights management
Mass digitization
Library circulation